No Stilettos is a short-lived BBC music series made by BBC Scotland in Glasgow, and presented by Scottish pop and folk musician Eddi Reader. The programme was broadcast in 1993 on BBC2 in the UK and featured a mix of musical guests with an emphasis on the alternative/independent music scene of the time. The programme was recorded in the Cottier Theatre, a converted church in Glasgow's west-end, and artists who featured included 'local' Scottish bands such as Aztec Camera Teenage Fanclub and the BMX Bandits, to those from further afield such as Evan Dando of the Lemonheads, American Music Club and Pulp.

References

External links 
 https://www.imdb.com/title/tt0300831/
 Pulp on No Stilettos in 1993

BBC Television shows
Scottish television shows
1993 British television series debuts
1993 British television series endings
1990s British music television series
BBC Scotland television shows
English-language television shows